Sensor Media Access Control(S-MAC) is a network protocol for sensor networks. Sensor networks consist of tiny, wirelessly communicating computers (sensor nodes), which are deployed in large numbers in an area to network independently and as long as monitor their surroundings in group work with sensors, to their energy reserves are depleted. A special form of ad hoc network, they make entirely different demands on a network protocol (for example, the Internet) and therefore require network protocols specially build for them (SMAC). Sensor Media Access Control specifies in detail how the nodes of a sensor network exchange data, controls the Media Access Control (MAC) to access the shared communication medium of the network, regulates the structure of the network topology, and provides a method for synchronizing.

Although today primarily of academic interest, S-MAC was a significant step in sensor network research and inspired many subsequent network protocols. It was introduced in 2001 by Wei Ye, John Heidemann and Deborah Estrin of the University of Southern California and was intended to conserve scarce, non-rechargeable energy resources of sensor nodes. The development was supported financially by the US military agency DARPA under the project Sensor Information Technology (Sensit).

See also 
 Zebra Media Access Control
 802.11
 handshaking
 Load balancer

External links 
 Sensor-MAC (S-MAC): Medium Access Control for Wireless Sensor Networks

References 

Network protocols